To Be Called For is a 1914 American silent short comedy directed by Francis J. Grandon and written by Wallace C. Clifton. The film stars Earle Foxe and Adda Gleason in the main roles.

Synopsis
Silas Brown, a close-fisted country hotel-keeper in Hicksville, has a pretty daughter, Betty, who has a devoted suitor in Otis Perkins, a typical country town boy. The curiosity of Betty is excited by a package marked for Francis King, "to be called for." For three weeks the package remains without a claimant. It accidentally falls to the floor and breaks open, showing a magnificent ball gown. Betty has been crying her pretty eyes out because her stingy father has refused her a party dress to wear at the church fair. She wears the unclaimed ball gown and makes a hit at the fair. Francis King, who is a traveling salesman, arrives the night of the fair, and admires Betty in her handsome gown, which he recognizes as one of his samples of a job lot. He sells the job lot to stingy old Silas at a low price because they are last year's samples. Betty confesses in tears, but King presents her with the sample dress, for which he has no further use. The jealousy of Otis is appeased while the salesman goes on to his next town.

Cast 
Adda Gleason - Betty Brown 
Lafe McKee - Silas Brown 
Earle Foxe - Otis Perkins   
Charles Wheelock - Francis King

References

External links

American silent short films
1914 films
American black-and-white films
Films directed by Francis J. Grandon
1914 comedy films
Silent American comedy films
1914 short films
American comedy short films
1910s American films